Luis Hernán Carvallo Castro (19 August 1922 – 24 March 2011), known as Hernán Carvallo, was a Chilean football midfielder who played for Chile in the 1950 FIFA World Cup. He also played for Universidad Católica.

International career
Carvallo made seven appearances for the Chile national team between 1946 and 1950, taking part in both the 1946 South American Championship and the 1950 FIFA World Cup.

Personal life
Carvallo was the father of the also footballers Fernando, who was an international with Chile, and Luis Hernán. All three played for Universidad Católica.

Carvallo was nicknamed Chico (Short) due to his height.

Record at FIFA tournaments

Honours
Universidad Católica
  (1): 
 Chilean Primera División (2): 1949, 1954
 Chilean Segunda División (1): 1956

References

External links
FIFA profile

1922 births
2011 deaths
Chilean footballers
Chile international footballers
Club Deportivo Universidad Católica footballers
Chilean Primera División players
Primera B de Chile players
1950 FIFA World Cup players
Association football midfielders